Eliza Clívia (November 14, 1979 – June 16, 2017) was a Brazilian singer of electronic forró.

Biography 
Influenced by her accordionist father, Eliza began her singing career in the city of Monteiro (PB) where she joined the Big Banda group, which later changed the name to Laços de Amor. In 2003, she joined Cavaleiros do Forró, where she remained for 10 years, during which time she participated in the recording of nine CDs and six DVDs. In 2013 it was announced that she would leave the band together with Jaílson Santos (she was married to him until 2016).

In 2013, Eliza and Jaílson announced their return to the stages in the Forró Cavalo de Aço, where it remained during five years, next to Marcelo Jubão and Neto Araújo. In 2017 she started her solo career.

Death 
Eliza died in the afternoon of June 16, 2017, at the age of 37, after an automobile accident at the intersection of Maruim and Arauá streets, Aracaju Center, Sergipe. Her car hit an urban transport bus. Besides Eliza and the driver, her boyfriend Sergio Ramos da Silva, also died in the accident. He was a musician and the manager of the singer.

She is buried in Cemitério da Saudade in Livramento, Paraíba.

Discography

Cavaleiros do Forró
CDs
2003 : 4 Estilos – Vol. 3
2004 : Nossa História, Nosso Acústico
2005 : Meio a Meio – Vol. 4
2006 : No Reino dos Cavaleiros – Vol. 5
2007 : Forrozada – Volume 6
2008 : Beber e Amar – Vol. 7
2010 : Cavaleiros do Forró – Volume 8
2011 : Ao Vivo em Aracaju
2012 : Cavaleiros Universitário

DVDs
2005 : O Filme ao vivo em Natal
2006 : O Filme 2 – No Reino dos Cavaleiros
2007 : Cavaleiros Elétrico – Ao Vivo em Feira de Santana
2007 : Ao Vivo em Caruaru
2008 : Volume 4: Beber e Amar – Ao Vivo em Maceió
2009 : Cavaleiros do Forró — 8 Anos
2011 : Volume 5 – Ao Vivo em Aracaju
2011 : Cavaleiros do Forró — 10 Anos

Forró Cavalo de Aço 
CDs
2013 : Cavalo de Aço: A História Continua
2014 : Cavalo de Aço: Promocional 2014
2015 : Cavalo de Aço: Promocional 2015

DVDs
2013 : Cavalo de Aço: Ao Vivo em Lagoa de Pedras
2014 : Cavalo de Aço: Ao Vivo em Campo Redondo
2014 : Cavalo de Aço: Ao Vivo no Forró Caju 2014
2015 : Cavalo de Aço: Ao Vivo em Lagoa de Pedras

See also 
 Cavaleiros do Forró

References

External links  
 Facebook Page

1979 births
2017 deaths
People from Paraíba
21st-century Brazilian women singers
21st-century Brazilian singers
Road incident deaths in Brazil